Dermatobranchus ornatus is a species of sea slug, a nudibranch, a marine gastropod mollusc in the family Arminidae.

Distribution
This species occurs in the Indo-Pacific region. It was described from the Philippines. It has been reported from Oman, Japan, Taiwan, Thailand, Malaysia, the Philippine Islands, Indonesia, and Australia.

References

Arminidae
Gastropods described in 1888